Atsushi Kobayashi may refer to:

Atsushi Kobayashi (pitcher, born 1986), Japanese baseball pitcher, 2011-present
Atsushi Kobayashi (pitcher, born 1972), Japanese baseball pitcher, 1999-2001
Atsushi Kobayashi (volleyball), player in the Japan men's national volleyball team